The Department of Welfare of Differently Abled Persons of state of Tamil Nadu is a department of the Government of Tamil Nadu, India

Sub-departments

Present Ministers for Welfare of Differently Abled Persons 
MK STALIN

References

Tamil Nadu state government departments
Year of establishment missing
Disability in India